The 2008–09 TFF First League (also known as Bank Asya First League due to sponsoring reasons) was the second-level football league of Turkey and the 46th season since its establishment in 1963–64. At the end of the season in which 18 teams competed in a single group, Manisaspor and Diyarbakırspor, which finished the league in the first two places, and the play-off winner Kasımpaşa were promoted to the upper league, while Sakaryaspor, Güngören Belediyespor and Malatyaspor, which were in the last three places, were relegated.

Teams

Team summaries

Standings

Results

Promotion play-offs

The Promotion play-offs will be played in Yenikent Asaş Stadium in Ankara. The Semi-final matches will take place on May 15. The League's third-placed team will play the sixth-placed team and the fourth-placed team will play the fifth-placed team. The winners of these matches will play on May 17 in the final match. The winner of this match will play in Süper Lig in the 2009–2010 season.

Top goalscorers

References 

 

TFF First League seasons
Turkey
1